The Hundred of Petina is a hundred within County of Dufferin, South Australia and was proclaimed in 1893.

The traditional owners of the hundred are the Wirangu peoples.

Nunjikompita and Pimbaacla are railway stations on the Eyre Peninsula Railway within the hundred.

See also
Lands administrative divisions of South Australia

References

Petina
Eyre Peninsula